Mark, Marc, or Marcus Webb may refer to:

Sportspeople
Mark Webb (placekicker) (born 1960), British American football kicker
Mark Webb (safety) (born 1998), American football safety
Mark Webb (Australian footballer), see West Coast Eagles draft history
Marc Webb (footballer) (born 1979), Australian rules football coach
Marcus Webb (born 1970), American basketball player

Others
Marc Webb (born 1974), American director and filmmaker
Mark Web, character in 100 Tears